Diego Nicolas Montiel (born 26 April 1995) is a Swedish professional footballer who plays as a central midfielder for Vendsyssel FF.

Club career
Montiel had youth spells with IK Franke and Västerås SK, he made his first-team debut with the latter on 7 July 2012 in a Division 1 Norra match against Östersund. In 2013, Montiel joined Allsvenskan club IF Brommapojkarna. He was named on the substitutes bench twice for the club's 2014–15 UEFA Europa League first qualifying round ties against VPS. After not appearing for the club's senior team he left and rejoined Västerås SK in 2014. He went onto score three goals in thirteen fixtures during the 2014 Division 1 season. In January 2015, Montiel completed a transfer to fellow Division 1 Norra team Dalkurd FF.

He participated in twenty-four games in his debut season with them as they won promotion to the 2016 Superettan. On 11 November 2016, it was announced that Montiel had agreed to sign for Allsvenskan side IK Sirius on a three-year contract and would officially join on 1 January 2017. He made his debut for IK Sirius in a Svenska Cupen match versus Arameisk-Syrianska IF and scored the fifth goal in a 0–5 win. On 28 July, Montiel joined Superettan side Gefle IF on loan. He scored his first Gefle goal in his second match, on 6 August, against IFK Värnamo. In total, Montiel scored two goals in fourteen matches for Gefle as they finished 12th.

He terminated his contract with Sirius in November 2017. On 5 December, Montiel agreed to join Superettan club Örgryte IS. In his opening six matches, Montiel scored five goals and assisted four. He ended the 2018 campaign as top scorer, netting thirteen goals alongside fourteen assists in twenty-eight appearances. He departed at the conclusion of his contract in December. At the end of the month, Montiel secured a move to Beerschot Wilrijk of the Belgian First Division B. In July 2019, Beerschot allowed Montiel to speak to a Swedish club with a view to a transfer. Västerås SK revealed he was training with them on 8 July.

On 15 July 2019, Vejle BK confirmed that they had signed Montiel on a two-year contract. He scored twice, versus Nykøbing and Vendsyssel FF, in his first three appearances for Vejle BK.

After two seasons at Vejle, Montiel joined Danish 1st Division club Vendsyssel FF on a two-year deal on 8 July 2021.

International career
Montiel, who is of Uruguayan descent, has represented Sweden at U17 level, debuting in a friendly tournament match against Iceland U17 in July 2014. His next cap came later that month in the same competition against Romania U17.

Career statistics
.

Honours
Dalkurd FF
Division 1 Norra: 2015

References

External links

 

1995 births
Living people
Sportspeople from Västerås
Swedish people of Uruguayan descent
Swedish footballers
Sweden youth international footballers
Association football midfielders
Swedish expatriate footballers
Expatriate footballers in Belgium
Expatriate men's footballers in Denmark
Swedish expatriate sportspeople in Belgium
Swedish expatriate sportspeople in Denmark
Ettan Fotboll players
Superettan players
Allsvenskan players
Challenger Pro League players
Danish 1st Division players
Västerås SK Fotboll players
IF Brommapojkarna players
Dalkurd FF players
IK Sirius Fotboll players
Gefle IF players
Örgryte IS players
K Beerschot VA players
Vejle Boldklub players
Vendsyssel FF players